Land speed racing is a form of motorsport.

Land speed racing is best known for the efforts to break the absolute land speed record, but it is not limited to specialist vehicles.

A record is defined as the speed over a course of fixed length, averaged over two runs (commonly called "passes"). Under current FIA rules, two runs are required in opposite directions within one hour, over a timed mile and a new record mark must exceed the previous one by at least one percent to be validated. Records are set in either the flying kilometre or flying mile. Motorcycle land speed racing requires 2 passes the same calendar day in opposite directions over a timed mile/kilo for AMA National Land Speed Records while FIM Land Speed World Records require two passes in opposite directions to be over a timed mile/kilo completed within 2 hours.

History 

The sport's origins date to the 1930s with the Mormon Meteor at Bonneville Speedway in Utah and in California, when the Southern California Timing Association first held meets for a variety of hot rodded vehicles.

Ever since, any vehicle – car, truck, or motorcycle – able to meet the class requirements and safety regulations has been able to make an attempt to break the existing record. For automobiles running under FIA sanctioning, the record is set by averaging two runs (commonly called "passes"), one in either direction, within the space of two hours.
All vehicles are separated by classes based on displacement. Vintage engines, like the Ford Flathead, Buick Straight Eight, Stovebolt engine and others are raced in the vintage classes. These consist of:

XF: Ford Flathead
XO: Overhead valve engines and non Ford flatheads built up to 1959.
XXF: Ford flatheads with overhead valve head conversions. 
XXO: Overhead valve engines with specialist cylinder heads.
V4: Vintage four cylinder engines made before 1935. Overhead valve/Overhead cam conversions permitted.
V4F: Vintage flathead four cylinder engines built before 1935, valvetrain must remain a valve in block.

Women's record 

In 1906, Dorothy Levitt broke the women's world speed record for the flying kilometer, recording a speed of 91 mph (146.25 km/h) and receiving the sobriquet the "Fastest Girl on Earth". She drove a six-cylinder Napier motorcar, a 100 hp (74.6 kW) development of the K5, in a speed trial in Blackpool.

In 1929, Frenchwoman Hellé Nice broke the female speed record. She reached 122.84 mph (197.7 km/h) in a Bugatti 35B on a 10 km course on the Montlhery track outside Paris. The feat was so great that the newspapers at the time named her "Queen of Speed".

According to author Rachel Kushner, Craig Breedlove had talked Lee into taking the car out for a record attempt in order to monopolize the salt flats for the day and block one of his competitors from making a record attempt.

For 43 years, the world record was held by Kitty O'Neil with a speed of 512.710 mph (825.127 km/h), in the jet-powered SMI Motivator, set at the Alvord Desert in 1976.

On August 20, 2019, 43 years later, American professional racer, television personality, and metal fabricator Jessi Combs attempted to break Kitty's long-standing world record at the age of 39 and at the same location. Combs died after her car suffered a mechanical failure on her second run from the opposite direction (used to establish an average to account for wind); the mechanical failure (located on the front wheel assembly) was speculated to have been caused by hitting an object in the desert. Despite dying during the execution of the run, her record attempt was eventually validated, and her new time was posthumously ratified by Guinness on 25 June 2020, ten months after the fatal attempt. Her time was recorded as 522.783 mph (841.338 km/h), which is more than 10 mph faster than Kitty O'Neil's historic record.

Records by class

Motorcycle record

1960–present wheel driven cars 
There is no "wheel-driven" category as such.  The Fédération Internationale de l'Automobile validates records in a variety of classes, of which the "wheel-driven" classes are in Category A (Special cars) and Category B (Production cars).  The accepted record is fastest average speed recorded over any one-mile or one-kilometer distance, averaged over two runs in opposite directions (to factor out wind) within one hour of each other.  The most recent wheel-driven record holders have been from a variety of different classes within Category A.

He drove the Burkland family streamliner powered by two 450+ cubic inch-displacement supercharged  Donovan engines (bought second-hand), with crankshafts bolted together nose-to-nose, running on methanol.

In September, 2010 George Poteet made an attempt to break the piston-engined wheel-driven record for the flying mile and flying kilometer. His car, Speed Demon, built by Ron Main, is powered by a  aluminum block 'Hellfire' V8, built by Kenny Duttweiler. Their effort was thwarted by a number of parts failures.

The model was tested in the Western Washington University wind tunnel, with assistance from Dr. Michael Seal.

In 2018 the Flashpoint Streamliner exceeded the record but was disqualified after being destroyed on its second pass, as two full successful passes are required to set a record. The car reached 436 and 451 mph on each pass, but was destroyed on the second pass as a result of a tire failure.

See also 
 Drag racing
 Hot rod
 Land speed record
 Street racing

Notes

External links 
 
  - Australian challengers to the supersonic showdown
 The UK Land Speed Racing Association 
 Speed Record Club - The Speed Record Club seeks to promote an informed and educated enthusiast identity, reporting accurately and impartially to the best of its ability on record-breaking engineering, events, attempts and history.
 The Land Speed Record in the Sixties: an on-line collection
 Land speed Record site for dedicated enthusiasts
 Landracing.com
 SCTA site
Bonneville Motorcycle Speed Trials

 
 
Record progressions
Superlatives